Jindřich Šimon Baar  (7 February 1869, Klenčí pod Čerchovem – 24 October 1925, Klenčí pod Čerchovem) was a Czech Catholic priest and writer, realist, author of the so-called country prose. He joined the Czech Catholic modern style, but later severed the ties with that movement. As writer, he emphasized traditional moral values of the countryside.

Born into a peasant family, he did religious studies and was ordained as a Catholic priest in 1892. As a priest, he strived, unsuccessfully, for reforms in the church.

Works
Among his novels are:
 Cestou křížovou (1900) – the first fruit, autobiographic description of the uneasy life as a reform priest
 Pro kravičku (1905)
 Farská panička (1906)
 Farské historky (1908)
 Jan Cimbura (1908) – highly idealized depiction of peasant life
 historical trilogy: Paní komisarka (1923), Osmačtyřicátníci (1924) and Lůsy (1925)

He also published several short stories and collections of fairy tales.

See also
 List of Czech writers

References

External links

  Biography
  Museum of Jindřich Šimon Baar in Klenčí pod Čerchovem
 English translation of Jan Cimbura by Blanch Zelmer

1869 births
1925 deaths
People from Domažlice District
People from the Kingdom of Bohemia
20th-century Czech Roman Catholic priests
Czech novelists
Male novelists
Czech male writers
19th-century Czech Roman Catholic priests